There is a small Roma population in Uruguay, most being the descendants of previous migrants. According to data available they number c. 400.
 
In Uruguay, they are commonly known as gitanos. They claim having ancestors from Serbia, Hungary and Romania.

References

Ethnic groups in Uruguay
Uruguay
Romani in South America
Immigration to Uruguay